Michael Nicolás Santos Rosadilla (born 13 March 1993) is a Uruguayan footballer who plays as a forward for Argentine club Talleres de Córdoba.

Club career

River Plate
Born in Montevideo, Santos was a River Plate Montevideo youth graduate. He made his first team – and Primera División – debut on 13 February 2011, coming on as a second-half substitute for Federico Puppo in a 1–2 home loss against Rampla Juniors.

On 28 April 2012, Santos scored his first professional goal, netting the winner in a 2–1 home win against Fénix. Exactly one month later, he was sent off for two bookable offenses in a 2–4 loss at Racing Montevideo.

Santos scored a career-best 21 goals during the 2014–15 season, with braces against Fénix, Sud América (two times), and Juventud Las Piedras, aside from a hat-trick against El Tanque Sisley. He also scored River's first ever goal in the Copa Libertadores, through a penalty in a 2–0 home win against Universidad de Chile.

Málaga
On 5 July 2016, Santos signed a four-year deal with La Liga club Málaga CF. He made his debut for the club on 23 October, replacing Jony in a 4–0 home routing of CD Leganés.

Santos scored his first goal in the Spanish top tier on 4 November 2016, netting the winner in a 3–2 home win against Sporting de Gijón.

Sporting Gijón (loan)
On 14 August 2017, Santos was loaned to Sporting, now in Segunda División, for one year. He scored 17 goals during the campaign, being the club's top goalscorer and the fifth overall in the category.

Leganés (loan)
On 1 August 2018, Santos was loaned to CD Leganés in the top flight, for one year.

FC Copenhagen
On 21 August 2019, Santos was signed by Danish club F.C. Copenhagen for a reported transfer fee of 2.25 million euro.

Return to Leganés (loan)
Santos returned to Lega on 14 September 2020, also in a temporary deal, with the club now in the second division.

Back to Copenhagen
In January 2021 it was reported, that Santos had returned to Copenhagen because he couldn't extend his work permit in Spain. On 31 January 2021 Copenhagen confirmed, that Santos' contract had been terminated by mutual consent.

Talleres 
On 6 February 2021, Santos signed a three-year contract with Argentine Primera División side Talleres.

International career
On 17 June 2015, Santos was included in Uruguay under-23s' 18-man list for the year's Pan American Games. He appeared in five matches during the tournament, scoring one goal against Brazil, as his side was crowned champions.

On 29 August 2015, Santos was called up to the senior squad by manager Óscar Tabárez as a replacement to injured Abel Hernández. He made his full international debut on 8 September, replacing Jonathan Rodríguez against Costa Rica.

Career statistics

Honours
River Plate
 Torneo Preparación: 2012
 Copa Integración: 2012

Uruguay U23
Pan American Games: 2015

References

External links

1993 births
Living people
Uruguayan footballers
Uruguayan expatriate footballers
Uruguay international footballers
Footballers from Montevideo
Association football forwards
Pan American Games medalists in football
Medalists at the 2015 Pan American Games
Pan American Games gold medalists for Uruguay
Footballers at the 2015 Pan American Games
Club Atlético River Plate (Montevideo) players
Málaga CF players
Sporting de Gijón players
CD Leganés players
F.C. Copenhagen players
Talleres de Córdoba footballers
Uruguayan Primera División players
Argentine Primera División players
La Liga players
Danish Superliga players
Uruguayan expatriate sportspeople in Spain
Uruguayan expatriate sportspeople in Denmark
Uruguayan expatriate sportspeople in Argentina
Expatriate footballers in Spain
Expatriate men's footballers in Denmark
Expatriate footballers in Argentina